Ukrainian cuisine is the collection of the various cooking traditions of the people of Ukraine, one of the largest and most populous European countries. It is heavily influenced by the rich dark soil (chernozem) from which its ingredients come and often involves many components. Traditional Ukrainian dishes often experience a complex heating process – "at first they are fried or boiled, and then stewed or baked. This is the most distinctive feature of Ukrainian cuisine".

The national dish of Ukraine is borscht, the well-known beet soup, of which many varieties exist. However, varenyky (boiled dumplings similar to pierogi) and a type of cabbage roll known as holubtsi are also national favourites and are a common meal in traditional Ukrainian restaurants. These dishes indicate the regional similarities within Eastern European cuisine.

The cuisine emphasizes the importance of wheat in particular, and grain in general, as the country is often referred to as the "breadbasket of Europe". The majority of Ukrainian dishes descend from ancient peasant dishes based on plentiful grain resources such as rye, as well as staple vegetables such as potato, cabbages, mushrooms and beetroots. Ukrainian dishes incorporate both traditional Slavic techniques as well as other European techniques, a byproduct of years of foreign jurisdiction and influence. As there has been a significant Ukrainian diaspora over several centuries (for example, over a million Canadians have Ukrainian heritage), the cuisine is represented in European countries and those further afield, particularly Argentina, Brazil, and the USA.

Soups 

 Borscht is a vegetable soup made out of beets, cabbage, potatoes, tomatoes, carrots, onions, garlic, dill. There are about 30 varieties of Ukrainian borscht. It may include meat or fish.
 Zelenyj borshch (green borscht) or shchavlevyj borshch (sorrel soup): water or broth based soup with sorrel and various vegetables, served with chopped hard-boiled egg and sour cream. It is to note the word "borscht" is not implying beet's presence.
 Kapusnyak: soup made with pork, salo, cabbage, beans, and served with smetana (sour cream).
 Rosolnyk: soup with pickled cucumbers.
 Solyanka: thick, spicy and sour soup made with meat, fish or mushrooms and various vegetables and pickles.
 Yushka: clear soup, made from various types of fish such as carp, bream, wels catfish, or even ruffe.

Salads and appetizers 

 Kovbasa: various kinds of smoked or boiled pork, beef or chicken sausage.
 Salo: cured fatback.
 Kholodets: aspic (Studenetz or richcake) made with meat or fish (zalyvna ryba).
 Olivier: salad made out of cooked and chopped potatoes, dill pickles, boiled chopped eggs, cooked and chopped chicken or ham, chopped onions, peas, mixed with mayonnaise.
 Vinigret: salad with cooked and shredded beets, sauerkraut, cooked and chopped potatoes, onions, and carrots, sometimes pickles mixed with some sunflower oil and salt.

Bread and grain

Bread and wheat products are important to Ukrainian cuisine. The country has been considered one of the traditional "breadbaskets" of the world. Decorations on the top can be elaborate for celebrations.
 Babka: Easter bread, usually a sweet dough with raisins and other dried fruit. It is usually baked in a tall, cylindrical form.
 Bublik: ring-shaped bread roll made from dough that has been boiled before baking. It is similar to bagel, but usually somewhat bigger and with a wider hole.
 Kolach: ring-shaped bread typically served at Christmas and funerals. The dough is braided, often with three strands representing the Holy Trinity. The braid is then shaped into a circle (circle = kolo in Ukrainian) representing the circle of life and family.
 Korovai: a round, braided bread, similar to the kalach. It is most often baked for weddings and its top decorated with birds and periwinkle.
 Palianytsia: regular baked bread (famously difficult to pronounce for non-Ukrainian speakers).
 Pampushky: soft, fluffy bread portions topped with garlic butter.
 Paska: traditional rich pastry.

Main courses 

 Banush: a cornmeal stew.
Varenyky: dumplings made with fillings such as mashed potatoes and fried onions, boiled ground meat and fried onions, liver and fried onions, fried cabbage with fried onions, quark, cherries, and strawberries. Served with sour cream and butter or sugar, when filled with fruits.
 Pyrizhky: baked buns stuffed with different fillings, such as ground meat, liver, eggs, rice, onions, fried cabbage or sauerkraut, quark, cherries etc.
 Pyrih: a big pie with various fillings.
 Holubtsi: cabbage or vine leaves (fresh or sour) rolled with rice filling and may contain meat (minced beef or bacon), baked in oil and caramelized onions and may contain as a baking sauce tomato soup, cream or sour cream, bacon drippings or roasted with bacon strips on top.
 Mlyntsi or nalisnyky: thin pancakes usually filled with quark, meat, cabbage, fruits, served with sour cream.
 Stuffed duck or goose with apples.
 Roast meat (pechenya): pork, veal, beef or lamb roast.
 Fish (ryba): fried in egg and flour; cooked in oven with mushrooms, cheese, and lemon; marinaded, dried or smoked variety.
 Guliash: refers to stew in general, or specifically Hungarian goulash.
 Kotlety/Sichenyky (cutlets, meatballs): minced meat or fish mixed with eggs, onions, garlic, breadcrumbs, and milk, fried in oil and sometimes rolled in breadcrumbs.
 Kotleta po-kyivsky: Kyiv-style chicken cutlet.
 Kruchenyky or Zavyvantsi: pork or beef rolls with various stuffing: mushrooms, onions, eggs, cheese, sauerkraut, carrots, etc.
 Kasha hrechana zi shkvarkamy: buckwheat cereal with pork rinds and onion.
 Potato (kartoplia, also barabolia or bulba): young or peeled, served with butter, sour cream, dill; a more exclusive variety includes raw egg.
 Deruny: potato pancakes, usually served with rich servings of sour cream.

Desserts 
 Kutia: traditional Christmas dish, made of poppy seeds, wheat, nuts, honey, and delicacies. 
 Pampushky: sweet dough similar to doughnut holes. Frequently tossed with sugar. Traditionally filled with rose preserve, but can also be filled with poppy seed or other sweet fillings.
 Syrnyky: fried quark fritters, sometimes with raisins, served with sour cream, jam (varennya), honey or apple sauce.
 Torte: many varieties of cakes, from moist to puffy, most typical ones being Kyivskyi, Prazhskyj, and Trufelnyj. They are frequently made without flour, instead using ground walnuts or almonds.
 Varennya: a whole fruit preserve  made by cooking berries and other fruits in sugar syrup.
 Zhele: (plural and singular) jellied fruits, like cherries, pears, etc. or Ptashyne moloko (literally ‘birds' milk’)—milk/chocolate jelly.
 Kyiv cake: creamy dessert consisting of two soft (soaked) cakes and a nut-chocolate cream.

Beverages

Alcoholic 
 Horilka (горілка): strong spirit of industrial production or its home-made equivalent –  ("самогон" or moonshine) is also popular, including with infusions of fruit, spices, herbs or hot peppers. One of the most exotic is flavoured with honey and red pepper.
 Beer (пиво): the largest producers of beer are Obolon, Lvivske, Chernihivske, Slavutych, Sarmat, and Rogan, which partly export their products.
 Wine (вино): from Europe and Ukraine (particularly from Crimea), mostly sweet. See Ukrainian wine.
 Mead (мед, or медуха): a fermented alcoholic beverage made from honey, water, and yeast. Its flavour depends on the plants frequented by the honeybees, the length of time and method of aging, and the specific strain of yeast used. Its alcohol content will vary from maker to maker depending on the method of production.
  (наливка): a homemade wine made from cherries, raspberries, gooseberries, bilberries, blackberries, plums, blackthorns and other berries. Berries were put into a sulija (a big glass bottle), some sugar was added. After the berries fermented, the liquid was separated from the berries, and put into corked bottles. The berries were used to make  (baked or fried pastry). The wine has about 15% of alcohol.

Non-alcoholic 

 Mineral water: well-known brands are Truskavetska, Morshynska, and Myrhorodska. They usually come strongly carbonated.
 Kompot  (компот): a sweet beverage made of dried or fresh fruits or berries boiled in water.
 Uzvar (узвар): a specific type of kompot made of dried fruit, mainly apples, pears, and prunes.
 Kvass (квас): a sweet-and-sour sparkling beverage brewed from yeast, sugar, and dried rye bread.
 Kefir (кефір): milk fermented by both yeast and lactobacillus bacteria, and having a similar taste to yogurt. Homemade kefir may contain a slight amount of alcohol.
 Pryazhene moloko (пряжене молоко): baked milk, a milk product having a creamy colour and a light caramel flavour. It is made by simmering milk on low heat for at least eight hours.
 Ryazhanka (ряжанка): fermented baked milk.

See also

 Culinary arts
 Mushroom picking in Slavic culture
 Twelve-dish Christmas Eve supper
 Cuisine of Odessa
 Olha Franko

References

Further reading
 UCWL Cook Book. Ukrainian Traditional and Favourite Recipes. — Yorkton : The Ukrainian Catholic Women's League, 1970. — 111 p.
 Artiukh, Lidia 1977, Ukrainska Narodna Kulinaria [Ukrainian Folk Cuisine], Naukova Dumka, Kyiv
 Artiukh, Lidia 2001, Ukrainian Cuisine and Folk Traditions, Baltija-Druk, Kyiv
 Corona, Annette 2012, The New Ukrainian Cookbook, Hippocrene Books, New York
 Faryna, Natalka (ed.) 1976, Ukrainian Canadiana, Ukrainian Women's Association of Canada, Edmonton
 Stechishin, Savella 1959, Traditional Ukrainian Cookery, Trident Press, Winnipeg
 Stechishin, Savella 2007, “Traditional Foods" Encyclopedia of Ukraine (Retrieved 2007-08-10)
 Tracz, Orysia 2015, First Star I See Tonight, Mazepa Publications Zhuravli, Winnipeg
 Ukrainian Food, Ukrainian International Directory
 Ukrainian Women's Association of Canada, Daughters of Ukraine Branch 1984, Ukrainian Daughters' Cookbook, Centax of Canada, Winnipeg
 Yakovenko, Svitlana 2013, Taste of Ukraine: Rustic Cuisine from the Heart of Ukraine, Sova Books, Sydney
 Yakovenko, Svitlana 2016, Ukrainian Christmas Eve Supper: Traditional village recipes for Sviata Vecheria, Sova Books, Sydney (e-format edition)

 
Cuisine